Praha is Czech for the city of Prague.

Praha may also refer to:

 Praha, Slovakia, a village and municipality
 Praha, Texas, US, an unincorporated community
 Praha (Brdy), a mountain in the Brdy range, Czech Republic
 Praha (train), a Warsaw-Prague express train since 1993
 2367 Praha, a main-belt asteroid
 Praha Spring, another name for Prague Spring

See also